Levinus Hulsius (1550 – 1606) was a maker and dealer of fine scientific instruments; publisher and printer; linguist and lexicographer; wrote extensively on the construction of geometrical instruments. Although he was born in Flanders he lived and worked in the Netherlands and Germany.

Works

Sources
 
 
 
Mathematics from the birth of numbers, Jan Gullberg, W. W. Norton & Company; 1st ed edition (October 1997), 1093 pages  
Ralf Kern: "Wissenschaftliche Instrumente in Ihrer Zeit". Band 2: "Vom Compendium zum Einzelinstrument". Verlag der Buchhandlung Walther König 2010, 

Belgian science writers
Scientists from Ghent
1546 births
1606 deaths
16th-century printers
17th-century printers
16th-century writers
17th-century writers
Businesspeople from Ghent